A by-election was held for the Australian House of Representatives seat of East Sydney on 28 September 1963. This was triggered by the death of long-serving Labor MP and Curtin and Chifley government minister Eddie Ward.

The by-election was won by Labor candidate Len Devine. The governing Liberal Party's decision not to nominate a candidate saw Devine receive over 80% of the first preference vote.

Results

References

1963 elections in Australia
New South Wales federal by-elections
September 1963 events in Australia